"The Three Linden Trees" (German: "Drei Linden") is a 1912 fairy tale by Hermann Hesse strongly influenced by the Greek legend of Damon and Pythias. The story, set in the medieval period, tries to explain three huge linden trees whose branches intertwine to cover the entire cemetery of the Hospital of the Holy Spirit in Berlin. 

According to the story, three brothers care very deeply for each other. One day, the youngest brother comes across a blacksmith's apprentice who has just been stabbed to death. While he decides whether to tell the authorities or to flee the scene of the crime, the city constables find him and arrest him for the murder. At his trial, facts come out that link him to the victim, and it appears that he will be hanged, despite all his protests that he is innocent.

Just then, the middle brother, who has been waiting for his younger brother to return home, hears what has happened. Not wanting to see his brother executed, he appears in court and accuses himself of the murder. He is locked up while the judge tries to determine who the real murderer is. Shortly after, the eldest brother returns home from his travels and, learning what happened to his two younger brother, accuses himself of the crime. He too is arrested. When the youngest brother unwittingly discovers what his two brothers have done on his behalf, he tearfully admits to the judge that he is the murderer. 

Not knowing whom to blame, the judge turns to the local prince. He does not believe that any of the brothers is guilty, but realizes that it is too important a decision to leave to chance. To resolve the problem, he announces that he will leave it up to God and comes up with an ordeal. Each of the brothers will plant a linden tree with its crown in the ground and its roots in the sky. Whoever's tree withered first would be considered the murderer. 

The unexpected happened and all three trees began to grow and flourish. All three brothers were innocent, so all three trees thrive. These are the trees overhanging the cemetery outside the Hospital of the Holy Spirit.

The story was written in German and originally published in Die Alpen in 1912.

The story can be found in The Complete Fairy Tales of Hermann Hesse (1995).

1912 short stories
Works by Hermann Hesse
German short stories
German fairy tales
Works originally published in German magazines